Archaeagnostus is an extinct genus from a well-known class of fossil marine arthropods, the trilobites. It lived from the terminal Toyonian to early Amgaian. Species belonging to this genus have been found in Eastern North America, the Newfoundland in Canada, the Henson Gletscher Formation in Greenland, the Nekekit and Molodo Rivers in Eastern Siberia, and in Guizhou, China.

References

Cambrian trilobites of North America
Peronopsidae
Agnostida genera
Extinct animals of North America
Cambrian trilobites of Asia
Paleozoic life of Quebec

Cambrian genus extinctions